Michael Fritz Mittermeier (born 3 April 1966) is a German comedian.

Early life
Mittermeier was born in Dorfen, Upper Bavaria. During his childhood he lived in Bavaria. After school he studied theatre.

Career 
In 1996, Mittermeier started the comedy program Zapped. Zapped was shown on his tours in Germany, Austria and Switzerland. He participated in comedy television shows as well as the German TV show Wetten, dass..?. The most well-known parts of Zapped are parodies of German advertisements as well as the US television series MacGyver, which later became a running gag. Mittermeier popularized the term "Arschgeweih" for Lower-back tattoo ("tramp stamp"; literally "ass antler"). His next comedy programs were Wahnsinnlich (1990), Zapped! (1999), Back to Life (2002), Paranoid (2004), Safari (2007) and Achtung, Baby! (2010).

In 1998, Mittermeier published Im Rausch der Kanäle together with Thomas Hermanns and Gudrun Allwang. In 2010, he published Achtung, Baby!

In 2001, he was featured in the music video for the Guano Apes (credited here as the Guano Babes) song, "Kumba Yo".

Mittermeier was also involved in the 2010 documentary This Prison Where I Live, featuring the Burmese comedian Zarganar who was imprisoned by his country's military junta for lampooning and criticizing them.

In 2012, Mittermeier performed his English-language show A German on Safari in New York, London, and at the Edinburgh Fringe.

Personal life 
Mittermeier married singer Gudrun Allwang in 1998.

Having been born (and brought up) in Bavaria, Mittermeier has been a lifelong fan of the football team Bayern Munich.

Awards

References

External links

 

1966 births
Living people
People from Erding (district)
German television personalities
German male voice actors
German comedy writers
German male comedians